Hara longissima is a species of South Asian river catfish from Myanmar.

References

Erethistidae
Taxa named by Heok Hee Ng
Taxa named by Maurice Kottelat
Fish described in 2007